The Suteans (Akkadian: Sutī’ū, possibly from Amorite: Šetī’u) were a Semitic people who lived throughout the Levant, Canaan and Mesopotamia during the Old Babylonian period. Unlike Amorites, they were not governed by a king. They were famous in Semitic epic poetry for being fierce nomadic warriors.
During the reign of Zimri-Lim (c. 1775–1761), they inhabited the vicinity of Terqa. They are mentioned in eight of the 382 Amarna letters. Like the Habiru, they traditionally worked as mercenaries, and were sometimes called Ahlamu. They are listed in documents from the Middle Assyrian Empire (1395-1075 BC) as being extant in the Amorite city of Emar, in what is now northeast Syria. Together with other Semitic peoples; the Chaldeans and Arameans, they overran swaths of Babylonia c. 1100 BC. They were eventually conquered by Assyria, along with the rest of Babylonia.

History

Bronze Age
One of the earliest known references to Suteans comes from a report of a Sutean attack on Qatna and Tadmor at the time of Shamshi-Adad I's reign (c. 1808–1776 BC). In another instance, Shamshi-Adad warns his son, Yasmah-Addu, that 1,000 Suteans were headed to raid Yabliya.

During the reign of Zimri-Lim (c. 1775–1761), Suteans appear to be involved in a slave-sale with a Mariote governor and their leader, Hammi-Talu, also rendered some services to Mari. They also appear to have paid a sheep tax to Mari for their use of pastureland as sheep herders themselves. Nevertheless, they also frequently attacked Mari's domains, to what they saw as unjust Mariote hegemony over their territories in Suhum.

At the time of Hammurabi, the Suteans attacked in the vicinity of Larsa after the conquest of the city by the former, but he later utilized their service as couriers.

Amarna letters
Around 1350 BC, the Suteans are mentioned in the Amarna letters. One letter mentioning the Suteans is entitled "Waiting for the Pharaoh's words", from Biryawaza of Dimasqu-(Damascus) to pharaoh:

This usage is somewhat atypical of the usage of Habiru and external mercenary forces in the Amarna letters, since this letter quotes them as being necessary and beneficial to the efforts of Biryawaza.

Iron Age
During the Iron Age, some Suteans settled in Chaldea along with the migrating Chaldean, Aramean and Arab tribes.

Language
The Sutean language has not been attested in any written texts, but appears to have been Semitic. This is known through individual names and tribal onomastics, most of which appear to be Akkadian and Amorite, while a small percentage appear to be neither but belonging to a Semitic language. Such onomastics include the name of a tribe, "Almutu", and the Sutean warrior featured in 13th century BC Ugaritic texts, "Yatpan". Wolfgang Heimpel hypothesizes Suteans may have spoken a language close to the later Aramaic or even Arabic.

According to Diakonoff Suteans and the biblical name Seth ( "placed, appointed") derive from the same root.

See also
 Amorites
 Shasu
 Shutu

References

2nd millennium BC
Canaan
Ancient peoples of the Near East